Love Live! Nijigasaki High School Idol Club is an anime television series produced by Bandai Namco Filmworks (under the Sunrise brand) as the third installment in the Love Live! franchise. It is directed by Tomoyuki Kawamura, with Jin Tanaka handling series composition and Takumi Yokota designing the characters. The series follows a group of individual school idols who compete with each other while working together to keep their school idol club alive. Together, they are referred as the Nijigasaki High School Idol Club. The first season aired 13 episodes on Tokyo MX from October 3 to December 26, 2020. A second season aired from April 2 to June 25, 2022. Funimation licensed the series and streams it on their website in North America, Odex in Southeast Asia (except Thailand) and Mongolia, and on AnimeLab in Australia and New Zealand.

For the first season, Nijigasaki High School Idol Club perform both the opening and ending themes, respectively titled  and "Neo Sky, Neo Map!". For the second season, Nijigasaki High School Idol Club again perform both the opening and ending themes, titled "Colorful Dreams!



Episode list

Season 1

Season 2

Notes

References

Lists of anime episodes
Love Live!